Sze Kin Wai (born 6 December 1984) is a Hong Kong professional footballer who currently plays as a defensive midfielder for Hong Kong Premier League club Tai Po.

Club career
Sze is considered to be one of the most prominent players of Tai Po of all time.

Honours
Tai Po
Hong Kong Third District Division League: 2003–04
Hong Kong FA Cup: 2008–09

References

External links
 HKFA

1984 births
Living people
Hong Kong footballers
Association football midfielders
Tai Po FC players
Hong Kong Premier League players
Hong Kong First Division League players